The emblem of Karakalpakstan is one of the official symbols (along with the flag and anthem) of  republic Karakalpakstan within Uzbekistan. It was approved on April 9, 1993. The coat of arms was developed from a sketch by Karakalpak artist Jollybai Izentaev based on the emblem of Uzbekistan.

Design
The emblem of Karakalpakstan is very similar to the emblem of Uzbekistan, and practically copies it in parts. It is a sign of the unity of the two republics. The emblem of Karakalpakstan shows the rising sun above the dark blue mountains and the ancient Zoroastrian fortress of Chilpyk - a symbol of ancient history and culture of the republic, the Amu Darya and the Aral Sea, surrounded by a wreath of wheat ears on the right and cotton branches with open boxes of cotton on the left. At the top of the coat of arms is an octahedron of blue with orange edges, inside which is a crescent with a white star. In the center of the coat of arms is a depiction of the mythical Kumai bird with open wings. The inscription "QARAQALPAQSTAN" (or "ҚАРАҚАЛПАҚСТАН") is written at the bottom of the ribbon bow of the wreath, which symbolizes the national flag of the republic. The wreath made of branches of cotton and wheat is tied with ribbons of flowers from the flags of Uzbekistan and Karakalpakstan.

History

First version 
The first Constitution of the Karakalpak ASSR was adopted on December 21, 1934, by the 2nd Congress of Soviets of the Autonomous Soviet Socialist Republic.

The emblem of the republic consisted of images on a red background of a golden sickle and hammer, placed criss-crosswise with handles downwards and surrounded by a wreath of wheat ears, at the bottom on the sling was the image of the Karakul rune.

Second version 
On March 23, 1937,  the new Constitution of the Karakalpak Autonomous Soviet Socialist Republic was approved. The constitution described the arms in Article 110:

Inscriptions on the arms: the abbreviation of the name of the republic in Uzbek "OZSSR", in Karakalpak "QQASSR" and in Russian "ККАССР"; the motto: in Karakalpak region "PYTKIL DYNJA PROLETARLARI BIRLESINIZ"; in Uzbek "BUTUN DUNJA PROLETARLARI BIRLASINIZ".

First revision 
In the late 1930s, the process of translating the written languages of the USSR into a Cyrillic basis began, in 1940 an alphabet and spelling rules for the Karakalpak language were developed. The new alphabet was introduced by decree of the Presidium of the Supreme Council of the CCASSR on July 18, 1940, which established a deadline before January 1, 1942 for the transition of the press, education and institutions to a new alphabet.

Inscriptions on the coat of arms: the abbreviation of the name of the republic in Uzbek "ЎССР", in Karakalpak "ҚҚАССР" and in Russian "ККАССР"; the motto: in Karakalpak language БАРЛЫК, ЕЛЛЕРДИН ПРОЛЕТАРЛАРЫ, БИРЛЕСИНИЗ!"; in Uzbek "БУТУН ДУНЁ ПРОЛЕТАРЛАРИ, БИРЛАШИНГИЗ!".

Second revision 
In 1956, the abbreviation mark between the letters on the coat of arms was deleted.

Third revision 
After the adoption of the new Constitution of the USSR in 1977 and the new Constitution of the Uzbek SSR, the Extraordinary 8th Session of the Supreme Soviet of the 9th convocation of the Karakalpak ASSR on May 29, 1978 adopted a new Constitution of the CCASSR. Article 156.

"The State Emblem of the Karakalpak Autonomous Soviet Socialist Republic is the State Emblem of the Uzbek SSR, which is an image of the sickle and hammer in the sun, surrounded by a wreath on the right of the wheat ears and to the left - cotton branches with flowers and open cotton boxes, a five-pointed star, and below it a part of the globe is depicted: on the ribbon there is a wreath of inscriptions: on the right - in the Karakalpak language "БАРЛЫК ЕЛЛЕРДИН ПРОЛЕТАРЛАРЫ, БИРЛЕСИНИЗ!", on the left - in Uzbek "БУТУН ДУНЁ ПРОЛЕТАРЛАРИ, БИРЛАШИНГИЗ!" Below on the ribbon of the ribbon there is an inscription "ЎзССР" and letters of a smaller size "ҚҚАССР".

Changes in the emblem of 1978: the abbreviation of the name of the republic in Russian was deleted; the distribution of the words of the motto on the ribbon turns has changed - if earlier on each tape there were two words arranged in two rows, now there are four words on the upper turn of the tape (in two rows), and on the bottom - only one.

References 

Karakalpakstan

Coats of arms with animals
Coats of arms with birds
Coats of arms with flags
Coats of arms with mountains
Coats of arms with suns
Coats of arms with wheat
Coats of arms with cotton
Heraldry
National symbols of Uzbekistan
Karakalpakstan